The   is a skyscraper located in Ōtemachi, Tokyo, Japan.

The construction of the 200-meter tower was finished in 2013. The building houses the Tokyo headquarters of the Yomiuri Shimbun, a daily newspaper that is part of the Yomiuri Group, Japan's largest media conglomerate.

References

External links 
Yomiuri Shimbun: Building Facilities 
 

Marunouchi
Skyscraper office buildings in Tokyo
Office buildings completed in 2013
Buildings and structures in Chiyoda, Tokyo
2013 establishments in Japan
Retail buildings in Tokyo